Nicodème Kabamba Wa Kabengu  (born 29 July 1936) is a Congolese former footballer who played as a midfielder. He grew up in Jadotville, where he received the nickname "Serpent de Rail" after the just-completed rail line between Jadotville and Kolwezi. Kabamba played for Standard Liège in Belgium from 1959 to 1963. 

Kabamba represented Congo-Kinshasa at the 1968 African Cup of Nations in Ethiopia, where he scored two goals (both coming in the match versus Congo-Brazzaville) in three group matches. He did not play in the semi-final or final as the national team won the continental title for the first time. At the time of the 1968 tournament, Kabamba was playing for CS Imana.

References

1936 births
Living people
People from Likasi
Democratic Republic of the Congo footballers
Association football midfielders
Democratic Republic of the Congo international footballers
1968 African Cup of Nations players
Africa Cup of Nations-winning players
Standard Liège players
Belgian Pro League players
Belgian Congo people
Daring Club Motema Pembe players
Democratic Republic of the Congo expatriate footballers
Democratic Republic of the Congo expatriate sportspeople in Belgium
Expatriate footballers in Belgium